The 2012 FIA GT3 European Championship was the seventh and final season of the FIA GT3 European Championship. The season commenced on 8 April at Nogaro and ended on 23 September at the Nürburgring. The season featured six double-header rounds, with each race lasting for a duration of 60 minutes. Most of the events were support races to the 2012 FIA GT1 World Championship; two of the six meetings were run in conjunction with the FIA GT1 World Championship, with combined grids being utilised.

Calendar
On 2 April 2012, the SRO announced the final calendar for 2012.

Entries
The entry list was published by the FIA on 3 April 2012. For the combined races with the FIA GT1 World Championship, GT3 cars ran with 100 in front of their usual car numbers.

Results and standings

Race results

Championships
Championship points will be awarded to the first ten positions in each race. Entries must complete 75% of the winning car's race distance in order to be classified and earn points. Individual drivers are required to participate for a minimum of 25 minutes in order to earn championship points in any race.

Drivers' Championship

Teams' Championship
Teams must have two cars at a race weekend in order to be eligible for scoring points in the Teams' Championship. If a team with just one car finishes in a points position, the cars of the teams that finished below get the extra points. As well as this, Esta Motorsports did not accrue points for their one-off appearance at the Moscow event, nor did Team Novadriver for their expanded two-car entry at the Nürburgring.

References

External links
 Official Website of the FIA GT3 European Championship

GT3 European Championship
FIA GT3 European Championship
FIA GT3 European Championship